The Essential Workers Monument is a planned memorial commemorating key workers for their work during the COVID-19 pandemic.

History
In June 2021, Governor Andrew Cuomo announced that the memorial would be located in Battery Park City. The monument's location faced opposition due to the process and location and will be installed in a different location.

In July 2021, the Battery Park Conservancy Essential Workers Monument Advisory Committee was formed to help identify a new location. It comprises seventeen people representing various neighborhood constituencies as well as state officials and essential workers.

References

Proposed monuments and memorials in the United States
COVID-19 pandemic in New York City
COVID-19 pandemic monuments and memorials
Battery Park City